Ajith Nishantha Rajapakse (born 6 January 1974) is a Sri Lankan politician, former provincial councillor, Member of Parliament. and the current Deputy Speaker of the Parliament of Sri Lanka

Rajapakse was born on 6 January 1974. He was a member of Ambalantota Divisional Council and the Southern Provincial Council.

He contested the 2001 parliamentary election as one of the People's Alliance electoral alliance's candidates in Hambantota District but failed to get elected. He contested the 2015 parliamentary election as one of the United People's Freedom Alliance (UPFA) electoral alliance's candidates in Hambantota District but failed to get elected after coming 5th amongst the UPFA candidates. He contested the 2020 parliamentary election as a Sri Lanka People's Freedom Alliance electoral alliance candidate in Hambantota District and was elected to the Parliament of Sri Lanka.

References

1974 births
Local authority councillors of Sri Lanka
Living people
Members of the 16th Parliament of Sri Lanka
Members of the Southern Provincial Council
People's Alliance (Sri Lanka) politicians
Sinhalese politicians
Sri Lankan Buddhists
Sri Lanka People's Freedom Alliance politicians
Sri Lanka Podujana Peramuna politicians
United People's Freedom Alliance politicians